Lemyra costalis is a moth of the family Erebidae. It was described by Jagbir Singh and A. Singh in 1998. It is found in Assam, India. Its taxonomy is known as " class Insecta".

References

costalis
Moths described in 1998